Laurie Jade Woodruff is an English author and writer of erotica.

Woodruff is known for such works as Diary of a Sex Addict which was released on 14 February 2019.

References

https://www.derbytelegraph.co.uk/news/local-news/laurie-woodruff-baby-death-breastfeeding-3442045

https://www.dailyrecord.co.uk/news/uk-world-news/sex-addict-used-sleep-six-14108956

External links
Goodreads

British writers
Living people
Year of birth missing (living people)